Pseudocalamobius leptissimus is a species of beetle in the family Cerambycidae. It was described by Gressitt in 1936.

References

Agapanthiini
Beetles described in 1936